No. 49 Squadron was a bomber squadron of the Royal Air Force from 1938 to 1965. They were the first squadron to receive the Hampden in September 1938.

The unit achieved fame through the Victoria Cross awarded to Rod Learoyd in 1940 and for its role in the British atomic and hydrogen bomb programmes. During Operation Buffalo in 1956, a Vickers Valiant from the squadron became the first British aircraft to drop a live atomic bomb. A year later, the squadron was entrusted with the task of dropping hydrogen bombs in Operation Grapple.

History
The squadron was formed at Swingate Down, near Dover, Kent, England in April 1916. In November 1917, the squadron deployed to France and their first operation was in the Battle of Cambrai. When the First World War ended, 49 Squadron became part of the occupying forces and disbanded in Germany in July 1919.

The squadron was reformed in February 1936 from 'C' flight on No. 18 Squadron at RAF Bircham Newton. The squadron initially reformed with Hind aircraft and relocated to RAF Scampton in March 1938. In September of the same year, the squadron started accepting Hampden aircraft, the first operational squadron to do so.

Second World War

During the Second World War they carried out the attack on the Dortmund-Ems Canal on 12 August 1940.
In 1942 No.49 Squadron converted to Manchesters, then Lancasters, and in October led No.5 Group's epic dusk attack on the Schneider armament and locomotive works at Le Creusot. In 1943 the squadron took part in the first "shuttle-bombing" raid (when the targets were Friedrichshafen and La Spezia), and the famous raid on Peenemunde. Among the targets which it attacked during 1944 were the coastal gun battery at La Pernelle on the Normandy coast, and the V-1 flying bomb storage sites in the caves at St. Leu d'Esserent on the River Oise, some 30 miles north-west of Paris. 

In December 1944, it took part in a raid on the German Baltic Fleet at Gdynia and in March 1945, was represented in the bomber force which so pulverised the defences of Wesel just before the crossing of the Rhine that Commandos were able to seize the town with only 36 casualties.

Mau Mau Uprising
No.49 Squadron remained with Lancasters until it was re-equipped with Lincolns in November 1949. They carried out 2 tours of duty during the Kenyan Mau Mau Uprising from November 1953 to January 1954 and from November 1954 to July 1955. During both these tours it was commanded by Squadron Leader Alan E. Newitt DFC. After returning to the UK, the squadron was disbanded at RAF Upwood on 1 August 1955.

Loss of Avro Lincoln SX984
During their second tour of operation Avro Lincoln SX984 was lost in an accident on 19 February 1955 while serving in Kenya during the Mau Mau Uprising.

On returning from an operational bombing sortie at 1540 hours, some 1hr 25mins flying time (total airborne time to the moment of the crash was 1hr 33mins), the pilot of SX984 carried out several unauthorized low passes over the police hut at Githunguri, where another 49 squadron crew was paying a visit.  On the third such pass SX984 struck the roof of the hut and a telegraph pole, breaking off part of the wing and some of its nose. It went into a steep climb, stalled and crashed to the ground 8 miles north north west of Kiambu killing five members of the crew and four civilians on the ground.  A visiting crew member called Pierson managed to pull the rear gunner from the wreckage but he died a few hours later of his injuries.

The finding of the Board of Inquiry was that the accident was caused by wilful disobedience of orders and unauthorized low flying.

There is a memorial window to the crew and civilians killed in the crash in St Leonard's Church, Sandridge in Hertfordshire, UK.

Vickers Valiant 
No.49 Squadron operated the Vickers Valiant from RAF Wittering and RAF Marham from 1 May 1956 until 1 May 1965.

Nuclear testing
.

Operation Buffalo
During Operation Buffalo in autumn 1956, No. 49 Squadron participated in the British nuclear tests at Maralinga. During the Buffalo R3/Kite test on 11 October 1956, Valiant B.1 WZ366 of No. 49 Squadron became the first RAF aircraft to drop a live atomic bomb. The pilot, Squadron Leader Edwin Flavell, and the bomb aimer, Flight Lieutenant Eric Stacey, were awarded the Air Force Cross. Fallout was minimal. Two clouds formed, a low-level one at about  that dropped all its radioactive material inside the prohibited area, and a high-level one at  that deposited a negligible amount of fallout over South Australia, Victoria and New South Wales.

Operation Grapple 
No. 49 Squadron also dropped seven of the nine nuclear bombs used in Operation Grapple, carried out in 1957 and 1958 at Malden Island and Kiritimati (Christmas Island) in the Pacific Ocean as part of the British hydrogen bomb programme. No. 49 Squadron had eight Valiants, but only four deployed: 
 XD818, piloted by Wing Commander Kenneth Hubbard, the squadron commander; 
 XD822, piloted by Squadron Leader L. D. (Dave) Roberts; 
 XD823, piloted by Squadron Leader Arthur Steele; and 
 XD824, piloted by Squadron Leader Barney Millett. 

The other four Valiants remained at RAF Wittering, where they were used as courier aircraft for bomb components. 

A full-scale rehearsal for Operation Grapple was held on 11 May, and on 14 May it was decided to conduct the Grapple 1 test the following day. The Grapple 1 mission was flown by Hubbard in XD818, with Millett and XD824 as the "grandstand" observation aircraft.

The two bombers took off from Christmas Island at 09:00.

Remaining aircraft
The sole remaining Vickers Valiant (XD818) –  the one that dropped the first British hydrogen bomb at Christmas Island with No.49 Squadron as part of Operation Grapple –  is preserved at the RAF Museum Cosford, near Wolverhampton.

References

Bibliography

Further reading

Richard Bartlett-May, son of Rear Gunner Sgt S A G Bartlett from information provided by the Historical Air Branch, Ministry of Defence, London and the 49 Squadron Association

External links

 History page on RAF website
 49 Squadron Association
 'Air of Authority'

049 Squadron
049 Squadron
Military units and formations disestablished in 1965